Justin Tyler Powell (born May 9, 2001) is an American college basketball player for the Washington State Cougars of the Pac-12. He previously played for the Tennessee Volunteers and Auburn Tigers.

High school career
Powell played basketball for Trinity High School in Louisville, Kentucky, where he was teammates with Jay Scrubb and David Johnson. For his junior season, he transferred to Montverde Academy in Montverde, Florida, one of the top teams in the nation. Powell returned to his home state, moving to North Oldham High School in Goshen, Kentucky, for his senior season. He averaged 22.2 points and 8.5 rebounds per game, but his season was cut short by a sports hernia that required surgery. He committed to playing college basketball for Auburn over offers from Georgia Tech, Kentucky, Ohio State and Xavier.

College career
On December 4, 2020, Powell posted a freshman season-high 26 points, shooting 7-of-9 from three-point range, and nine assists in a 90–81 win over South Alabama. In his next game, on December 12, he recorded 26 points and eight rebounds in a 74–71 win over Memphis. Powell was named Southeastern Conference (SEC) Freshman of the Week two days later. During a game against Texas A&M on January 2, 2021, he suffered a serious concussion, causing him to miss the remainder of the season. In 10 games as a freshman, he averaged 11.7 points, 6.1 rebounds and 4.7 assists per game. For his sophomore season, Powell transferred to Tennessee.

Career statistics

College

|-
| style="text-align:left;"| 2020–21
| style="text-align:left;"| Auburn
| 10 || 7 || 27.6 || .429 || .442 || .765 || 6.1 || 4.7 || .9 || .0 || 11.7

References

External links
Tennessee Volunteers bio
Auburn Tigers bio

2001 births
Living people
American men's basketball players
Auburn Tigers men's basketball players
Basketball players from Kentucky
Montverde Academy alumni
Shooting guards
Tennessee Volunteers basketball players
Trinity High School (Louisville) alumni